Fetal scalp blood testing is a technique used in obstetrics during labor to confirm whether fetal oxygenation is sufficient.

The procedure can be performed by creating a shallow cut by a transvaginally inserted blood lancet, followed by applying a thin pipe to the site that samples blood by capillary action.

Two constituents that are commonly tested by this method are pH and lactate, both being indicators of acid base homeostasis. A low pH and high level of lactate indicate that there is acidosis, which in turn is associated with hypoxia. 

Scalp pH and lactate appear to have the same sensitivity in predicting umbilical artery acidemia. Analysis of pH requires a relatively large amount of blood (30–50 μl), and sampling failure rates of 11–20% have been reported. Analysis of lactate only requires 5 μl of blood.

See also
 Fetal scalp stimulation test

References

Tests during pregnancy